Beryozovo is an abandoned selo in the Anadyrsky District of Chukotka Autonomous Okrug in Russia. It was located on the left bank of the Velikaya. In 1949, it was a center of a revolt against the central authority, which was related to forcible collectivization of reindeer herds.

In 1951, the whole population of the selo was resettled to Vayegi.

References 

Anadyrsky District
Rural localities in Chukotka Autonomous Okrug
Former populated places in Russia